Baptiste Serin (born 20 June 1994) is a French rugby union player. His position is Scrum-half and he currently plays for Toulon and the France national team.

Club career
Born in La Teste-de-Buch in Gironde, Serin began his career with nearby club Bordeaux Bègles in the Top 14.

International career
He made his international debut during France's 2016 tour of Argentina. He started the first match at scrum-half, paired with Jules Plisson at fly-half, and received praise from coaches, players, and the press despite being in the losing side (30-19). He started the second match as well, this time associated with François Trinh-Duc, and this time took on the kicking duties too. They won that game 0-27 in what was Guy Novès's first away win as France manager, with Serin shining again.
He was then included in the 2016/17 30-man "elite" list, made of players selected by the French national team to be protected and not allowed to play more than 30 games that year. He was then selected to play in the Autumn Internationals but started all three games on the bench, behind Maxime Machenaud. France ended the series with a 19–24 loss to world champions New Zealand, in which Serin came onto the pitch during the second half and gave a remarkable out-the-back pass for Louis Picamoles to score the only French try of the game.
Baptiste made his 6 Nations debut against England on 4 February 2017.

International tries

References

External links
France profile at FFR
ESPN profile

1994 births
Living people
French rugby union players
Union Bordeaux Bègles players
RC Toulonnais players
Rugby union scrum-halves
France international rugby union players
Sportspeople from Gironde
CA Bordeaux-Bègles Gironde players